Election subversion typically refers to meddling with the vote counting process (whereas voter suppression seeks to disrupt the vote casting process for those likely to vote for a particular candidate). Electoral fraud is a form of illegal election subversion, whereas this article focuses on loopholes in election law to subvert elections.

Avenues for election subversion

Vote buying 
This tactic for subversion (along with all others) has existed in all parts of the world at one time or another.

Question/deny legitimacy of election 
This tactic to deny unfavorable results weakens the power of the winners through decreasing the number of citizens who find them legitimate, potentially leading to a breakdown in the rule of law as was seen on January 6, 2021 in the United States. These claims can also be used to try to justify the manipulation of election results in the courts or other bodies of power such as legislatures.

Intimidation and/or replacement of election officials 
By major candidates calling into question the integrity of elections, the ensuing threats towards election officials has led to hundreds of resignations in the U.S. for example, leading to concerns of understaffing and some vacancies being filled by hyper-partisans interested in election subversion.

Disqualification of votes 
Rules that make voting more difficult for some, for example, can become a pretext for disqualifying votes, regardless of whether or not it justifies such a radical action. The U.S. Supreme Court heard a case that would pave the way for state legislatures to use pretexts to disqualify votes and send their own electors in lieu of the choice of that states' voters as early as 2024.

Election insecurity 
The lack of election security and transparency best-practices creates opportunities for compromised election systems/ballots by third-parties.

See also 
Authoritarianism

Democratic backsliding

Electoral fraud

Fascism

Unfair election

Voter suppression

References

Political corruption
Voter suppression
Electoral fraud
Injustice
Political campaign techniques